Flowers for Algernon is a 2000 American-Canadian television film written by John Pielmeier, directed by Jeff Bleckner and starring Matthew Modine.  It is the second screen adaptation of Daniel Keyes' 1966 novel of the same name following the 1968 film Charly.

Plot
It follows the same plot as the movie made in 1968.

Cast

Production
The film was shot in Toronto.

References

External links
 
 

Films based on American novels
CBS network films
Television shows based on American novels
English-language Canadian films
Canadian drama television films
Films directed by Jeff Bleckner
Remakes of American films
2000 television films
2000 films
Films shot in Toronto
American drama television films
2000s American films
2000s Canadian films